The Bend Amateur Athletic Club Gymnasium is a historic building in Bend, Oregon, United States. It was added to the National Register of Historic Places (NRHP) in 1983. The building was designed by Lee Arden Thomas and built by Guy H. Wilson.

When the Bend School Board established a building committee to develop plans for a new high school in 1923, they followed recommendations from the building committee and accepted the Bend Amateur Athletic Club building from the Bend Holding Company to use as the high school's gymnasium. The school would become Old Bend High School (also listed on the NRHP).

References

Further reading
Bend Amateur Athletic Club Deschutes County website

National Register of Historic Places in Bend, Oregon
Buildings and structures completed in 1917
1917 establishments in Oregon
Sports in Bend, Oregon
Sports venues completed in 1917